Robert Frater (24 February 1902 – 17 August 1968) was a New Zealand cricketer. He played fifteen first-class matches for Auckland between 1918 and 1932.

See also
 List of Auckland representative cricketers

References

External links
 

1902 births
1968 deaths
New Zealand cricketers
Auckland cricketers
Cricketers from Auckland